The San Luis Obispo Railroad Museum, in San Luis Obispo, California, was founded to preserve and present the railroad history of California, and specifically the Central Coast, by collecting, restoring, displaying, and operating historic railroad equipment. The museum also maintains a research library, and document and photographic archives, and is developing an oral history program. The museum is open every Saturday from 10 am to 4 pm, and other times for groups by arrangement. The museum hosts special events in May and October each year. The museum's website, periodic emails, and the quarterly Coast Mail newsletter provide information on activities and resources.

The Facility
Opened in 2013, the museum occupies the restored former Southern Pacific Freighthouse (built 1894) at 1940 Santa Barbara Avenue, adjacent to the Union Pacific main line and about one-quarter mile south of the San Luis Obispo Amtrak station. A standard-gauge display track extends along the east side of the building, and a short narrow-gauge display track is on the west side. The Freighthouse contains an exhibit hall and a model railroad depicting the three-foot-gauge Pacific Coast Railway at Port San Luis circa 1920 and the standard-gauge Southern Pacific Coast Line from Surf to Paso Robles, including the Cuesta Grade crossing of the Santa Lucia range circa 1950 (under construction in 2018 but largely operational). There is a children's play area incorporating hands-on train tables and a Museum Store offering railroad books, lanterns, and clothing, and other items. The building, its restrooms, and the model railroad area are fully accessible. The platform along the display track provides a safe place to view and photograph passing and waiting trains.

The collection
On display are express wagons, station furnishings, switch stands, signal components, telegraph equipment, historical and contemporary photographs, a handcar, a velocipede, push cars, mine and orchard railway equipment, and locomotive headlights, bells, and whistles. Library books, documents, and photographs are being cataloged and are available to researchers by arrangement.

Rolling stock 
La Cuesta, a 1926 Pullman observation-lounge car originally built for the Santa Fe Railway is undergoing restoration and can be boarded from the freighthouse platform.
 Southern Pacific bay window caboose No. 1886 is on the display track and almost completely restored inside and out.
 A former Southern Pacific tank car manufactured in 1903 (pressed and riveted steel) is on the display track and undergoing restoration.
 A former Southern Pacific steel gondola with wood side extensions, used in sugar beet service, is on the display track and is undergoing restoration.
 Former United States Army Corpse of Engineers (Quartermaster Corps) No. 2038, a 20-ton Plymouth switching locomotive, acquired in 1941 and used to development and supply Camp Roberts near San Miguel, California, during World War II; it is on the display track, in good condition, but not its original appearance.
 Pacific Coast Railway boxcar No. 706 has been cosmetically restored on the exterior and the interior has been converted to storage and restrooms, accessible from the Freighthouse interior.
Pacific Coast Railway boxcar from the 1200 series is undergoing cosmetic restoration and is displayed on the west side of the building.
 Southern Pacific Class C-30-1 wood-sided, cupola caboose is awaiting restoration and is viewable by docent-led tours in the museum's nearby storage and work yard.
 Southern Pacific Class B-50-13, outside-braced boxcar is awaiting restoration and is viewable by docent-led tours in the museum's nearby storage and work yard.
Southern Pacific subsidiary Pacific Motor Trucking semitrailer is awaiting restoration and is viewable by docent-led tours in the museum's nearby storage and work yard

See also 
 List of heritage railroads in the United States
 List of museums in California

References

External links
Official San Luis Obispo Railroad Museum website
 Southern Pacific Historical & Technical Society
 History Center of San Luis Obispo County

Museums in San Luis Obispo County, California
Railroad museums in California
Buildings and structures in San Luis Obispo, California